Aston juxta Mondrum is a civil parish in Cheshire East, England. It contains five buildings that are recorded in the National Heritage List for England as designated listed buildings, all of which are at Grade II. This grade is the lowest of the three gradings given to listed buildings and is applied to "buildings of national importance and special interest". The parish is crossed by the Middlewich Branch of the Shropshire Union Canal, and is almost entirely rural. The listed buildings consist of a church, two farmhouses, and two structures associated with the canal, an accommodation bridge and a lock.

See also
Listed buildings in Cholmondeston
Listed buildings in Church Minshull

Listed buildings in Poole
Listed buildings in Worleston

References
Citations

Sources

Listed buildings in the Borough of Cheshire East
Lists of listed buildings in Cheshire